Fritz Rumey was a German First World War fighter ace credited with 45 confirmed aerial victories.

List of victories

This list is complete for entries, though obviously not for all details. Background data was abstracted from Above the Lines: The Aces and Fighter Units of the German Air Service, Naval Air Service and Flanders Marine Corps, 1914–1918, pp. 193–194. Abbreviations were expanded by the editor creating this list.

Footnotes

References

Sources

Aerial victories of Rumey, Fritz
Rumey, Fritz